Queen Victoria: Demon Hunter is a 2009 novel by A. E. Moorat. It is a story based on the life of Queen Victoria, but incorporating a fictional account of her dealings with demons.

Plot summary
Victoria becomes the Queen of the United Kingdom following the death of her uncle William IV in 1837. However, she is soon thrown into a fight she did not expect: a war with demons.

Historical characters
 Queen Victoria: the queen regnant of the United Kingdom of Great Britain and Ireland from 20 June 1837, and the first Empress of India of the British Raj from 1 May 1876 until her death on 22 January 1901.
 Lord Melbourne: Prime Minister of the United Kingdom in 1834 and from 1835 to 1841.
 Maggie Brown: The servant to the Queen.
 Prince Albert: Prince Consort of the United Kingdom from 1840 until his death in 1861.
 John Conroy: A British army officer who became the chief attendant of the Duke and Duchess of Kent, who were the parents of Queen Victoria.

Fictional characters
 Lord Quimby: A lord who has a manservant and who also is bribed.
 Perkins: Manservant to Lord Quimby who later on in the story becomes a zombie.
 McKenzie: Journalist who bribes Lord Quimby.

See also

 Abraham Lincoln, Vampire Hunter
 Henry VIII: Wolfman

References

2009 British novels
British alternative history novels
Parody novels
Zombie novels
Books about Queen Victoria
Novels set in the 19th century
Fictional demon hunters